The Queensland Women's Under-18 rugby league team, also known as Queensland Women's Under-18s or Queensland U18 Women's, represents Queensland in the sport of rugby league at an under-18 age level. Established in 2019, the team played their first fixture against the New South Wales Women's Under-18 team as a curtain raiser to the Women's State of Origin game. They are administered by the Queensland Rugby League.

History
In December 2017, the Queensland Rugby League (QRL) announced an under-18 women's Emerging Origin development squad and camp after running an under-15 camp earlier that year. The squad, coached by current under-18 women's coach Ben Jeffries, was held over three days in January 2018. In January 2019, a second under-18 squad was selected, which he featured a number of players who would go onto be selected in the inaugural Queensland women's under-18 side.

On 11 April 2019, it was announced that the first every under-18 women's State of Origin game would be held as a curtain raiser to the Women's State of Origin fixture at North Sydney Oval. On 7 June 2019, the inaugural side was selected, which included Rhiannon Revell-Blair, who played for the senior Queensland side a year earlier as a 17-year-old. On 21 June 2019, the side lost to New South Wales 24–4 in the inaugural under-18 women's Origin fixture.

Players
The majority of the players selected for the Queensland women's under-18 side play in either the SEQ Senior Women's Division 1 competition, the premier women's rugby league competition in Queensland, or the SEQ under-18 Girls competition. Each pre-season the Queensland Rugby League will select an under-18 squad featuring players in contention for the mid-season fixture. The squad participates in a weekend camp at the Queensland Academy of Sport.

2019 squad
The 27-woman training squad selected for the 2019 season:

Results

2019
Played as a curtain raiser to the 2019 Women's State of Origin.

See also
Queensland women's rugby league team

References

Queensland rugby league team
Rugby League State of Origin
Rugby league representative teams in Queensland
Women's rugby league teams in Australia